DSST may refer to:

Denver School of Science and Technology, a Charter High School in Denver, Colorado
DSST (standardized test), a Department of Defense Standardized Test
Digit symbol substitution test